The 1968 United States presidential election in New Hampshire took place on November 5, 1968, as part of the 1968 United States presidential election, which was held throughout all 50 states and the District of Columbia. Voters chose four representatives, or electors to the Electoral College, who voted for president and vice president.

New Hampshire was won by the Republican nominees, former Vice President Richard Nixon of California and his running mate Governor Spiro Agnew of Maryland. Nixon and Agnew defeated the Democratic nominees, incumbent Vice President Hubert H. Humphrey of Minnesota and his running mate Senator Edmund Muskie of Maine.

Nixon took 52.10% of the vote to Humphrey's 43.93%, a margin of 8.18%.

Like the rest of Upper New England, New Hampshire in this era normally leaned Republican, however the state had voted overwhelmingly Democratic just four years earlier in 1964, when the staunch conservatism of Republican Barry Goldwater drove the liberal Northeastern United States, including New Hampshire, to deliver landslide victories to Democratic incumbent Lyndon B. Johnson. In 1964 Johnson had carried New Hampshire by a landslide 64–36 margin.

In 1968, the GOP sought to recover from their crippling defeat with Goldwater, and the party looked to former Vice President and the party’s narrowly defeated 1960 presidential nominee, Richard Nixon. Nixon was seen as a mainstream moderate Republican who could unite the competing factions of the Republican Party, and win back the moderate voters that Goldwater had alienated. The party recovered successfully and won back the White House and New Hampshire was returned to the Republican column. However, with four of the six New England states voting for Humphrey, New Hampshire became one of the two New England states (the other being neighboring Vermont) to vote for Nixon.

The “George Wallace Party” candidate, Southern populist Governor George Wallace of Alabama, did not have a serious impact on the race. While taking 13.53% nationally and winning electoral votes from five Southern states, Wallace would take only 3.76% of the vote in New Hampshire. Wallace’s base of support was in the South, and he had practically no appeal in Northeastern states like New Hampshire. New Hampshire would be Wallace’s fifth weakest state in the nation.

The county map results followed a familiar pattern of the post-New Deal era, with Nixon winning seven counties to Humphrey’s three. Since Franklin Roosevelt’s election in 1932, in every close election or Democratic victory, Hillsborough County, Strafford County, and Coös County would vote Democratic, while Carroll County would be the most Republican county. This pattern endured in 1968 for the last time, with Humphrey winning the three core New Deal Democratic counties, while Carroll County was the only county in the state where Nixon broke seventy percent of the vote. Humphrey's strongest county was Coös County, which he won by a 53–44 margin – this being along with 2004 one of only three occurrences since 1892 when  has supported a losing presidential candidate; Nixon thus became the first Republican to win the White House without carrying Coös County since Benjamin Harrison in 1888.

As Nixon narrowly eked out a victory over Humphrey nationally, New Hampshire's results in 1968 made the state about 7% more Republican than the national average. As of 2020, this is the most recent election in which New Hampshire was not the most Republican state in New England, as Nixon won Vermont by a slightly wider margin.

Nixon had previously won New Hampshire in 1960 and would later win it again in 1972. Nixon's victory was the first of six consecutive Republican victories in the state, as New Hampshire would not vote for a Democratic candidate again until Bill Clinton in 1992. Since then it has become a Democratic leaning swing state.

Results

Results by county

See also
 Presidency of Richard Nixon
 United States presidential elections in New Hampshire

Notes

References

1968
New Hampshire
1968 New Hampshire elections